Joseph Calvin "Butch" Robins (born May 12, 1949, in Lebanon, Russell County, Virginia) is an American five-string–banjo player with his own, distinct style. He's an individualist and, according to himself, "a seeker of information, knowledge and wisdom."

Biography
Few banjo players are as innovative or stylistically diverse as is "Butch" Robins. He was one of the longest-tenured banjoists for Bill Monroe and The Blue Grass Boys, and bassist for the New Grass Revival, earning him the distinction of being "the one and only New Grass/Blue Grass Boy."

Early years
As a student of music and the banjo in the 1960s and '70s, Robins acquainted himself with and befriended many of the first generation bluegrass musicians at early festivals and fiddlers' conventions.

As a teenager, he won major banjo contests and participated in banjo workshops at the 1969 Newport Folk Festival and at Carlton Haney's 1969 Camp Springs Bluegrass Festival, in Reidsville, North Carolina.

While serving in the United States Army in South Carolina, Robins was introduced to Snuffy Jenkins & Pappy Sherrill. He later dedicated his first solo album, Forty Years Late, to Snuffy.

1970s group and solo
In the 1970s, Robins performed in a number of bands, including Charlie Moore, Jim & Jesse, Wilma Lee & Stoney Cooper, and the New Grass Revival. During these years, he explored various banjo techniques, and helped lay the groundwork for the progressive, melodic, five-string banjo playing of today. As a self-produced solo recording artist with interest in and attention to ensemble sound, Robins released three landmark albums with Rounder Records: Forty Years Late, Fragments of My Imagicnation, and The Fifth Child.

Bill Monroe and the Blue Grass Boys
From 1977 until 1981, Robins played banjo for Bill Monroe and his Blue Grass Boys, performing throughout the United States, including the White House and Lincoln Center in New York City.

The Bluegrass Band
Robins formed the Bluegrass Band in 1972; it was disbanded one year later. The band started up again in 1989, this time with members Wayne Henderson (guitar), Ronnie Simpkins (bass), Wyatt Rice (guitar), Arnie Solomon (mandolin), Robins (banjo), Rickie Simpkins (violin, mandolin, vocals), and Larry Stephenson (mandolin, vocals).

Hay Holler Records
Robins launched the Hay Holler record label, and the Bluegrass Band recorded four albums that were sold via telemarketing: Once Again From the Top volumes 1 and 2 were traditional bluegrass, and Shine Hallelujah Shine volumes 2 and 2 were traditional gospel.

Grounded-Centered-Focused
In 1995, Robins produced a masterpiece banjo-oriented bluegrass recording, Grounded-Centered-Focused, featuring a talented supporting cast, including Bill Monroe.

The World International Blue Grass Band
As a result of traveling to and performing in Japan, Australia and Europe, Robins recruited some of the world's finest bluegrass musicians into the World International Blue Grass Band in 2007 as "a musical statement of international cooperation and goodwill." This band toured Virginia before performing at the International Bluegrass Music Association (IBMA) Convention in Nashville, Tennessee, and recording a live TV performance on Song of the Mountains for the Public Broadcasting Service (PBS).

Autobiography
Robins's autobiography What I Know 'Bout What I Know earned positive reviews and a nomination for IBMA's Print Media Personality of the Year award in 2004.

Music instruction
Butch has also been an instructor at several camps, including the Tennessee Banjo Institute, Jack Hatfield's Smoky Mountain Banjo Academy, Midwest Banjo Camp, Augusta Heritage Center, and Camp Ausgrass in Australia.

Bluegrass Videos
In 2013, Butch recorded a series of videos for Radford University entitled "Butch Robins Presents- Blue Grass Music, its Origin and Development as a Unique and Creative Art Form."  In this five-part video series, Robins explains the fascinating history of bluegrass music, using recorded and live music to set and illustrate the timeline, relate real-life anecdotes from the musicians involved, and relate personal stories of his life and relationship with Bill Monroe. He draws on his relationship with Monroe and other musicians to provide a unique perspective.

Session work
Robins has been a prolific freelance banjo player, performing with big band leader Harry James and with Rock and Roll Hall of Fame member, Leon Russell, and many others.

Awards
On September 24, 2016, Butch Robins was inducted into the Bill Monroe Bluegrass Hall of Fame in Bean Blossom, Indiana.

Discography

Solo albums
 1977: Forty Years Late (Rounder)
 1978: Fragments Of My Imagicnation (Rounder)
 1980: The Fifth Child (Rounder)
 1990: "The Bluegrass Band - Once Again From The Top" (Hay Holler)
 1991: "The Bluegrass Band - Shine Hallelujah Shine" (Hay Holler)
 1991: "The Bluegrass Band - 2nd Cut" (Hay Holler)
 1995: "Grounded Centered Focused" (Hay Holler)

With the Clinch Mountain Clan
 1976: "Wilma Lee & Stoney Cooper" (Rounder)

With Bill Monroe
 1981: "Master of Bluegrass" (MCA Records)

With Leon Russell
 1973: "Hank Wilson's Back" (Shelter Records)

With New Grass Revival
 2005: "Grass Roots: The Best of New Grass Revival" (Capitol)

With Kenny Baker
 1971: "A Baker's Dozen" (County)

Further reading
Tony Trischka, Pete Wernick: Masters of the 5-String Banjo, Oak Publications, (1988).
Butch Robins: What I Know 'Bout What I Know: The Musical Life of an Itinerant Banjo Player, 1st Books Library, (2003).
 Audio: Butch wins Bean Blossom banjo contest in 1969
 Videos: Butch playing at Tex Logan's 85th birthday 2012
Smith, Richard D.: Can't You Hear Me Callin' - The Life of Bill Monroe, Little, Brown and Company, (2000)
Adler, Thomas A.: Bean Blossom, University of Illinois Press, (2011)
Ledgin, Stephanie P.: From Every Stage - Images of America's Roots Music, University Press of Mississippi, (2004)
Trischka, Tony: Banjo Song Book, Oak Publications, (1977)
Silver, Barry: "Butch Robins" Bluegrass Unlimited, May, 1979, P. 48
Chernesky, Ed, "Butch Robins" Banjo Newsletter, May, 1981, p. 4-9.
Siminoff, Roger H. "Butch Robins" FRETS, June, 1981, p. 32.
Warlick, Tom, "Butch Robins: A Banjo Icon Practicing The Art of Living" Banjo Newsletter, Oct, 2003, p. 18.
Warlick, Tom, "Butch Robins, Part 2" Banjo Newsletter, Nov, 2003, p. 30.
Hatfield, Jack, "Butch Robins" Banjo Newsletter, Apr 2016.

References

External links 
 
 Butch Robins at Rounder
 Butch Robbins on Facebook
 
 

1949 births
Living people
American blues singers
Country blues musicians
American banjoists
People from Lebanon, Virginia